James Merriman may refer to:

 James Merriman (soccer coach) (born 1985), Canadian soccer coach
 James Merriman (politician) (1816–1883), Australian politician
 James Merriman (rugby union) (born 1984), Welsh rugby union player
 James A. Merriman (1869–1946), American physician and newspaper publisher